Mohawk (Kanienʼkéha, "[language] of the Flint Place") is an Iroquoian language currently spoken by around 3,500 people of the Mohawk nation, located primarily in current or former Haudenosaunee territories, predominately Canada  (southern Ontario and Quebec), and to a lesser extent in the United States (western and northern New York). The word "Mohawk" is an exonym. In the Mohawk language, the people say that they are from Kanien:ke ('Mohawk Country' or "Flint Stone Place") and that they are Kanienʼkehá꞉ka "People of the Flint Stone Place" or "People of the Flint Nation".

The Mohawks were extremely wealthy traders, as other nations in their confederacy needed their flint for tool-making. Their Algonquian-speaking neighbors (and competitors), the People of Muh-heck Heek Ing ("food-area place"), a people called by the Dutch "Mohicans" or "Mahicans", called the People of Ka-nee-en Ka "Maw Unk Lin" or Bear People. The Dutch heard and wrote that as "Mohawks" and so the People of Kan-ee-en Ka are often referred to as Mohawks. The Dutch also referred to the Mohawk as Egils or Maquas. The French adapted those terms as Aigniers or Maquis, or called them by the generic Iroquois.

History
The Mohawks were the largest and most powerful of the original Five Nations, controlling a vast area of land on the eastern frontier of the Iroquois Confederacy. The North Country and Adirondack region of present-day Upstate New York would have constituted the greater part of the Mohawk-speaking area lasting until the end of the 18th century.

Current status

The Mohawk language is currently classified as threatened, and the number of native speakers has continually declined over the past several years.

Mohawk has the largest number of speakers among the Northern Iroquoian languages, and today it is the only one with more than a thousand remaining speakers.  At Akwesasne, residents have begun a language immersion school (pre-K to grade 8) in Kanienʼkéha to revive the language. With their children learning it, parents and other family members are taking language classes, too.

A Mohawk language immersion school was established. Mohawk parents, concerned with the lack of culture-based education in public and parochial schools, founded the Akwesasne Freedom School in 1979. Six years later, the school implemented a Mohawk language immersion curriculum based on a traditional cycle of fifteen seasonal ceremonies, and on the Mohawk Thanksgiving Address, or Ohén꞉ton Karihwatékwen, "The words before all else." Every morning, teachers and students gather in the hallway to recite the Thanksgiving Address in Mohawk.

An adult immersion program was also created in 1985 to address the issue of intergenerational fluency decline of the Mohawk language.

Kanatsiohareke (Gah-nah-jo-ha-lay-gay), meaning "Place of the clean pot", is a small Mohawk community on the north bank of the Mohawk River, west of Fonda, New York.[1] Kanatsiohareke was created to be a "Carlisle Indian Boarding School in Reverse", teaching Mohawk language and culture.[2] Located at the ancient homeland of the Kanienkehaka (Mohawk), it was re-established in September 1993 under the leadership of Thomas R. Porter (Sakokwenionkwas-"The One Who Wins").[3] The community must raise their own revenue and frequently hold cultural presentations, workshops, and academic events, including an annual Strawberry Festival.[4] A craft shop on site features genuine handmade Native crafts from all over North America.

The primary mission of the community is to try to preserve traditional values, culture, language and lifestyles in the guidance of the Kaienerekowa (Great Law of Peace).[5] Kanatsiohareke, Inc. is a non-profit organization under IRS code 501c3.

In 2006, over 600 people were reported to speak the language in Canada, many of them elderly.

Kahnawake is located at a metropolitan location, near central Montreal, Quebec,  Canada. As Kahnawake is located near Montreal, many individuals speak both English and French, and this has contributed to a decline in the use of Mohawk language over the past century. The Mohawk Survival School, the first immersion program was established in 1979. The school's mission was to revitalize Mohawk language. To examine how successful the program had been, questionnaire was given to the Kahnawake residents following the first year. The results indicated that teaching towards younger generation have been successful and showed an increase in the ability to speak the language in private settings, as well as an increase in the mixing of Mohawk in English conversations were found.

Current number of speakers
In 2011, there were approximately 3,500 speakers of Mohawk, primarily in Quebec, Ontario and western New York. Immersion (monolingual) classes for young children at Akwesasne and other reserves are helping to train new first-language speakers. The importance of immersion classes among parents grew after the passage of Bill 101, and in 1979 the Mohawk Survival School was established to facilitate language training at the high school level.
 Kahnawake and  Kanatsiohareke offer immersion classes for adults. In the 2016 Canadian census, 875 people said Mohawk was their only mother tongue.

Usage in popular culture
Mohawk dialogue features prominently in Ubisoft Montreal's 2012 action-adventure open world video game Assassin's Creed III, through the game's main character, the half-Mohawk, half-English Ratonhnhaké꞉ton, also called Connor, and members of his native Kanièn꞉ke village around the times of the American Revolution. Ratonhnhaké꞉ton was voiced and modelled by Crow actor Noah Bulaagawish Watts. Hiawatha, the leader of the Iroquoian civilization in Sid Meier's Civilization V, voiced by Kanentokon Hemlock, speaks modern Mohawk.

The stories of Mohawk language learners are also chronicled in 'Raising The Words', a short documentary film released in 2016 that explores personal experiences with Mohawk language revitalization in Tyendinaga, a Mohawk community roughly 200 kilometres east of Toronto, Ontario, Canada. The film was set to be shown at the 4th annual Ethnografilm festival in Paris, France.

The Mohawk language is used in the 2017 film Mohawk, the 1991 film Black Robe, and the 2020 television series Barkskins.

Dialects
Mohawk has three major dialects: Western (Ohswé:ken and Kenhté:ke), Central (Ahkwesáhsne), and Eastern (Kahnawà꞉ke and Kanehsatà꞉ke); the differences between them are largely phonological. These are related to the major Mohawk territories since the eighteenth century.

Phonology
The phoneme inventory of Mohawk is as follows (using the International Phonetic Alphabet). Phonological representation (underlying forms) are in /slashes/, and the standard Mohawk orthography is in bold.

Consonants
An interesting feature of Mohawk (and Iroquoian) phonology is that there are no labials (m, p, b, f, v), except in a few adoptions from French and English, where  and  appear (e.g., mátsis matches and aplám Abraham); these sounds are late additions to Mohawk phonology and were introduced after widespread European contact.

Consonant clusters

The Central (Ahkwesáhsne) dialect has the following consonant clusters. 
All clusters can occur word-medially; those on a tinted background can also occur word-initially.

Note that th and sh are pronounced as consonant clusters, not single sounds like in English thing and  she.

Consonant voicing

The consonants  and the clusters  are pronounced voiced before any voiced sound (i.e. a vowel or ). They are voiceless at the end of a word or before a voiceless sound.  is voiced word initially and between vowels.

kà꞉sere  ‘car’
thí꞉ken [ˈthǐːɡʌ̃] ‘that’
shé꞉kon [ˈshɛ̌ːɡũ] ‘still’

Vowels

Mohawk has oral and nasalized vowels; four vowel qualities occur in oral phonemes /i e a o/, and two only occur as nasalized vowels (/ /). Vowels can be long or short.

Suprasegmentals

Stress, length, and tone 
Mohawk words have both stress and tone, and it can be classified as a restricted tone system (aka pitch-accent system). Stressed vowels carry one of four tonal configurations, two of which are contour tones: high, low, rising and falling tones. Contour tones only occur in syllables with long vowels. 

Stress, vowel length and tone are connected in Mohawk phonology.
High tone usually appears in closed syllables containing a short vowel, or before /h/. It is written with an acute accent: káhi /ˈkáhi/ ‘fruit’, oháha /oˈháha/ ‘road’.
Rising tone generally occurs in open syllables. It is written with a combination acute accent and colon: town kaná꞉ta, man rón꞉kwe. Notice that when it is one of the nasal vowels which is long, the colon appears before the n.
The underlying  or  reappears when stress is placed elsewhere. It is written with a grave accent and colon: stomach onekwèn꞉ta (/oneˈkwʌ̃̂ːta/.

In the standard spelling, a colon is placed after a vowel to lengthen it.  There are 4 tones: mid, high, mid-low falling and mid-high rising, the latter two appear on long vowels (marked as V:).

Orthography 

Mohawk orthography uses the following letters:  ⟨a e h i k n o r s t w y⟩ along with ⟨’⟩ and ⟨꞉⟩. The orthography was standardized in 1993. The orthography matches the phonological analysis as above except:
The glottal stop  is written with an apostrophe ⟨ʼ⟩, but is often omitted at the end of words, especially in Eastern dialect where it is typically not pronounced.

Written ⟨ts⟩ in the Eastern dialect (reflecting pronunciation), as in tsá꞉ta [ˈdzǎːda] ‘seven’.
Written ⟨tsi⟩ in the Central dialect, as in tsiá꞉ta [ˈdʒǎːda] for ‘seven’
Written ⟨tsy⟩ in the Western dialect, as in tsyá꞉ta [ˈdʒǎːda] for ‘seven’.

Typically written with ⟨i⟩ in the Central and Eastern dialects, as in ià꞉iaʼk [ˈjâːjaʔk] ‘six’.
Typically written with a ⟨y⟩ in the Western dialect, as in yà꞉yaʼk [ˈjâːjaʔk] for ‘six’.
The nasalized vowel  is written as ⟨en⟩, as in énska [ˈʌ̃́nska] ‘one’.
The nasalized vowel  is written ⟨on⟩, as in shaʼté꞉kon [shaʔˈdɛ̌ːɡũ] ‘eight’.
In cases where the vowel /e/ or /o/ is followed by an /n/ in the same syllable, the /n/ is written with an under-macron diacritic: keṉhó꞉tons ‘I am closing a door’. If the ⟨ṉ⟩ did not have the diacritic, the sequence  would be pronounced . Another convention is to write the nasal vowel with an ogonek, e.g. .
The low-macron accent is not a part of standard orthography and isn't used by the Central or Eastern dialects. In standard orthography, /h/ is written before /n/ to create the [en] or [on]: kehnhó꞉tons 'I am closing it'.

Grammar

Mohawk words tend to be longer on average than words in English, primarily because they consist of a large amount of morphemes, or 'meaningful parts'.

Mohawk expresses a number of distinctions on its pronominal elements: person (1st, 2nd, 3rd), number (singular, dual, plural), gender (masculine, feminine/indefinite, feminine/neuter) and inclusivity/exclusivity on the first person dual and plural. Pronominal information is encoded in prefixes on the verbs; separate pronoun words are used for emphasis. There are three main paradigms of pronominal prefixes: subjective (with dynamic verbs), objective (with stative verbs), and transitive.

There are three core components to the Mohawk proposition: the noun, the predicate, and the particle.

Mohawk words can be composed of many morphemes. What is expressed in English in many words can often be expressed by just one Mohawk word, a phenomenon known as polysynthesis.

Nouns
Nouns are given the following form in Mohawk:

Noun prefixes give information relating to gender, animacy, number and person, and identify the word as a noun.

For example:

1) oʼnenste   "corn"

2) oienʼkwa  "tobacco"

Here, the prefix  o- is generally found on nouns found in natural environments. Another prefix exists which marks objects that are made by humans.

3) kanhoha     "door"

4) kaʼkhare  "slip, skirt"

Here, the prefix ka- is generally found on human-made things. Phonological variation amongst the Mohawk dialects also gives rise to the prefix ga-.

Noun roots are similar to nouns in English in that the noun root in Mohawk and the noun in English have similar meanings.

(Caughnawaha)

5) –eri-  "heart"

6) –hi- "river"

7) –itshat- "cloud"

These noun roots are bare. There is no information other than the noun root itself. Morphemes cannot occur individually. That is, to be well-formed and grammatical, -eri- needs pronominal prefixes, or the root can be incorporated into a predicate phrase.

Nominal suffixes aren't necessary for a well-formed noun phrase. The suffixes give information relating to location and attributes. For example:

Locative Suffix:

8) i. onuʼtaʼ              "hill"

ii. onutaʼke  "on the hill"

9) i. onekwvhsaʼ       "blood"

ii. onekwvhsaʼke   "in the blood"

Here the suffix < -ke > denotes location.

Attributive Suffix:

10) kvjyʼ                  "fish"

11) kvjaʼkoʼwa       "sturgeon" or "big fish"

Here, the suffix -koʼwa denotes an augmentative suffix, which increases the attribute of the noun in question.

Verbs
Mohawk verbs are one of the more complex parts of the language, composed of many morphemes that describe grammatical relations. The verb takes the following structure:

Mohawk grammar allows for whole propositions to be expressed by one word, which we classify as a verb. The other core elements (subjects, objects, etc.) can be incorporated into the verb. Well-formed verb phrases contain at the bare minimum a verb root and a pronominal prefix. The rest of the elements are not necessary.

Tense, aspect and modality are expressed via suffixes on the verb phrase as well.

Some examples:

This is composed of three parts; the pronominal prefix, the verb root and a suffix which marks aspect. Mohawk seems to prefer aspect markers to tense to express grammaticalisation in time.

This example shows multiple prefixes that can be affixed to the verb root, but certain affixes are forbidden from coexisting together. For example, the aorist and the future tense affix will not be found on the same well-formed sentence.

Here, different prefixes and suffixes are used that mark tense, aspect and modality.

Most grammatical relations in Mohawk are expressed through various different affixes onto a verb. Subjects, objects, and relationships between subjects and objects are given their own affixes. In Mohawk, each transitive relationship between subjects and objects are given their own prefix. For example:

Each of these affixes are denoting a transitive relationship between two things. There are more affixes for denoting transitive relationships like "we-they", they-us (inclusive/exclusive), etc.

Noun incorporation

One of the features of Mohawk called noun incorporation allows a verb to absorb a noun into it. When incorporation happens, an epenthetic a can appear between the noun root and the verb root. For example:

18) Owiraʼa wahrakeʼ ne oʼwahru

Baby      ate        the  meat

With noun incorporation:

19) Owiraʼa wahaʼwahrakeʼ

Baby     meat-ate

20) Waʼeksohareʼ                 "She dish-washed"   ks = dish, ohare=wash

21) Waʼkenaktahninuʼ           "I bed-bought"   nakt = bed + a (increment) + hninu=buy

22) Wahanaʼtarakwetareʼ     "He bread-cut"           naʼtar = bread + a (increment) + kwetar=cut

Most of these examples take the epenthetic vowel a; it can be omitted if the incorporated noun doesn't give rise a complex consonant cluster in the middle of the word.

Education
Six Nations Polytechnic in Ohsweken, Ontario, offers Ogwehoweh language Diploma and Degree Programs in Mohawk or Cayuga.

Since September 2017, the University of Waterloo in Waterloo, Ontario Offers a credit course in Mohawk; the classes are given at Renison University College in collaboration with the Waterloo Aboriginal Education Centre, St. Paul's University College.

Resources are available for self-study of Mohawk by a person with no or limited access to native speakers of Mohawk. Here is a collection of some resources currently available:

Talk Mohawk, an iPhone app and Android app, includes words, phrases, and the Thanksgiving Address from Monica Peters 
 Rosetta Stone levels 1 and 2 (CD-ROM) edited by Frank and Carolee Jacobs and produced by the Kanienʼkehá꞉ka Onkwawén꞉na Raotitióhkwa Language and Cultural Center at Kahnawà꞉ke (secondary/high school level)
 A collection of 33 vocabulary lessons provided by the Mohawk Language Custodian Association. Lesson Collection at KanehsatakeVoices.com
 David Kanatawakhon Maracle, Kanyenʼkeha Tewatati (Let's Speak Mohawk),  (book and 3 companion tapes are available from Audio Forum) (high school/college level)
 Nancy Bonvillain, A Grammar of Akwesasne Mohawk (professional level)
 Nancy Bonvillain and Beatrice Francis, Mohawk–English, English–Mohawk Dictionary, 1971, University of the State of New York in Albany (word lists, by category)
 Chris W. Harvey, Sathahitáhkhe' Kanienʼkéha (Introductory Level Mohawk Language Textbook, Eastern Dialect),  (high school/college level)
 Josephine S. Horne, Kanienʼkéha Iakorihonnién꞉nis (book and 5 companion CDs are available from Kahnawà꞉ke Cultural Center) (secondary/high school level)
 Nora Deering & Helga Harries Delisle, Mohawk: A Teaching Grammar (book and 6 companion tapes are available from Kahnawà꞉ke Cultural Center) (high school/college level)
 On October 8, 2013 Daryl Kramp, Member of Parliament for Prince Edward-Hastings announced, on behalf of Shelly Glover, Minister of Canadian Heritage and Official Languages, support for the Tsi Kionhnheht Ne Onkwawenna Language Circle (TKNOLC) to develop Mohawk language-learning tools.
 Tom Porter and Dorothy Lazore, Nobody Can Do It Better Than Wariso꞉se: Language Guide and Dictionary
 FirstVoices, a free online learning tool, includes videos, text entries, pictures, games, an iPhone app and Android app to facilitate language learning, teaching and revitalization.
 Speak Mohawk, an app that can be downloaded from iTunes or Google Play, facilitates language by teaching words and phrases

Keyboards 
There are software packages available for both the Microsoft Windows and Mac operating systems to enable typing of the Mohawk language electronically. Both packages are available through FirstVoices, a web-based project to support Aboriginal peoples' teaching and archiving of language and culture.

See also
Iroquoian languages
Oneida language
Seneca language
Mohawk Dutch

References

Further reading
Hoover, M. L. (1992). "The revival of the Mohawk language in Kahnawake". Canadian Journal of Native Studies, 12(2), 269-287.
McAlpine, L., Eriks-Brophy, A., & Crago, M. (1996). "Teaching Beliefs in Mohawk Classrooms: Issues of Language and Culture". Anthropology & Education Quarterly, (3). 390.
Julian, C. (2011). A history of the Iroquoian languages (Unpublished doctoral dissertation). University of Manitoba, Winnipeg.
Maracle, B. J. (2002). "Adult Mohawk language immersion programming". McGill Journal of Education, 37(3), 387.
Deering, N., & Harries-Delisle, H. (1976). Mohawk. A Teaching Grammar. Preliminary Version.
Michelson, G. (1973). A thousand words of Mohawk, (No. 5), National Museum of Man.

External links

 
 
 Mohawk Language API for developers of software, websites, mobile apps, video games (ar, vr and mixed reality).
 Mohawk Language Profile, The Endangered Languages Project
 kanienkeha.net, "Mohawk Dictionary" Endangered Language Initiative.
 Kanehsatake Voices, online lessons, Bilingual Mohawk course in English and French
 TalkMohawk.com, Mohawk language mobile apps
 Mohawk - English Dictionary, Websters Online Dictionary
 Mohawk language, alphabet and pronunciation, Omniglot
 Marianne Mithun, "A grammar sketch of Mohawk", Conseil Supérieur de la Langue Française, Quebec 
 Mohawk Language Texts, from the Boston Athenæum: Schoolcraft Collection of Books in Native American Languages. Digital Collection.

+
Northern Iroquoian languages
Indigenous languages of the North American eastern woodlands
First Nations languages in Canada
Languages of the United States
Native American language revitalization
Languages of New York (state)